Orozco the Embalmer (Spanish: Orozco el embalsamador) is a 2001 Spanish-language Japanese mondo film directed by Kiyotaka Tsurisaki. It follows a Colombian embalmer named Froilan Orozco Duarte, who is shown living in El Cartucho, an impoverished and crime-ridden area of Bogotá, Colombia, where the homicide rate is high and corpses can be seen on the streets.

The film comprises footage taken over a period of several years, documenting in a graphic cinéma vérité manner Orozco's embalming of corpses. Orozco died during the production of the film.

References

Bibliography

External links
 
 

2001 films
Japanese documentary films
2000s Spanish-language films
Films shot in Colombia
Films set in Colombia
Mondo films
Biographical documentary films
Documentary films about death
2000s Japanese films